Lists of Marylebone Cricket Club players cover players for the Marylebone Cricket Club, founded in 1787 and based since 1814 at Lord's Cricket Ground. The lists are divided by period.

Lists

 List of Marylebone Cricket Club players (1787–1826)
 List of Marylebone Cricket Club players (1827–1863)
 List of Marylebone Cricket Club players (1864–1894)
 List of Marylebone Cricket Club players (1895–1914)
 List of Marylebone Cricket Club players (1919–1939)
 List of Marylebone Cricket Club players (1946–1977)
 List of Marylebone Cricket Club players (1978–)

Lists of English cricketers
Marylebone Cricket Club